Myrrha Lot-Borodine (1882–1954) was a Russian-born French academic who specialized in French and Anglo-Saxon medieval literature and Eastern Orthodox theology.

Works
 La Femme dans l'œuvre de Chrétien de Troyes, (A. Picard et fils, 1909)
 Le roman russe contemporain (1900–1912), (Libraire Léopold Cerf, 1912)
 (with Ferdinand Lot) Etude sur le Lancelot en prose, (H. Champion, 1918)
 Trois essais sur le roman de Lancelot du Lac et la Quête du Saint Graal, (H. Champion, 1919)
 Tristan et Lancelot, Imprimerie Peyriller, Rouchon et Gamon, 1924
 Nicolas Cabasilas: un maître de la spiritualité byzantine au XIV. Siècle, (Éditions de l'Orante, 1958)
 De l'amour profane à l'amour sacré, (Nizet, 1961)
 La déification de l'homme selon la doctrine des pères grecs, with a preface by Jean Daniélou, (Cerf, 1970).

References

1882 births
1954 deaths
Medievalists
20th-century French historians